The Amtrak Railroad Anacostia Bridge is a railway bridge that crosses the Anacostia River in Washington, D.C. It carries Amtrak's Northeast Corridor and MARC's Penn Line passenger rail traffic. The bridge was damaged by the 1933 Chesapeake–Potomac hurricane, causing the famous "Crescent Limited wreck".

Construction
On February 26, 1903, the Commissioners of the District of Columbia gave their approval for the Baltimore and Potomac Railroad (B&P, then controlled by the Pennsylvania Railroad, or PRR) to build a more direct line from Baltimore to the District of Columbia. The new route would be called the Magruder Branch (because it crossed the Magruder Branch, a stream which is a tributary of the Anacostia River). It would largely replace the local section of the Washington City Branch, which crossed the Anacostia  to the south. The Magruder Branch would connect the new Union Station with the PRR's Magruder Station in Landover, Maryland (a major hub for the railroad).

The commissioners also approved the necessary bridge across the Anacostia (then also known as the "Eastern Branch"). The United States Army Corps of Engineers, which at the time had control over rivers and bridges in the District of Columbia, approved the new bridge in September 1903. Construction began in 1904. By the end of January 1905, the bridge was nearly finished, with the foundation and entire substructure complete. As of April 1906, one of the two tracks across the bridge had been laid.

Wreck of the Crescent Limited
The bridge was the site of the famous "Crescent Limited wreck." On August 23, 1933, a hurricane (known today as the Chesapeake–Potomac Hurricane of 1933) passed over the District of Columbia, bringing  of rain, extensive flooding, and much damage. Early in the morning on August 24, the Crescent Limited—a high-fare, luxury train catering to wealthy individuals—derailed as it crossed the bridge, plunging the locomotive and some of the passenger cars into the Anacostia River.

The Anacostia's floodwaters had undermined the bridge's central piers, causing the bridge to sag and the rails to separate. The bridge's destruction had been swift: A track foreman had inspected the bridge 90 minutes before the wreck and found it sound, and a track walker had crossed the bridge just 10 minutes earlier and saw no damage.

There was amazingly little loss of life. The engineer and fireman were both killed, and 13 passengers injured (but only two severely). Just 30 passengers were aboard, which limited casualties. The couplings between the cars also held, preventing more cars from crashing into the river. Other factors also helped. When the train left Baltimore, railroad officials warned the engineer to slow down because of conditions created by the hurricane, and the locomotive's steam had been cut off (with the object of allowing the train to coast down the grade into the city). The cost of the disaster was estimated at between $80,000 and $240,000 ($ to $ in  dollars). More than 300 workers began clearing the wreck the next day.

Several people were injured while clearing the wreck and rebuilding the bridge. A dredge, several cranes, and a pile-driver were brought on to shore up the bridge and help remove debris and wreckage. Two men were hurt on August 24 by debris and cranes attempting to lift the locomotive from the water. Two days later, a man was killed when a telephone pole on the bridge toppled onto him. The same day, the pile-driver fell into the river. Another worker was injured on August 27 after being hit by a boom. At least one wrongful-death lawsuit was filed. A temporary single-track span was erected on August 28, and traffic over the bridge resumed shortly thereafter.

An inquest into the wreck was scheduled for August 30. The inquest determined that flooding caused by the hurricane had undermined the bridge's piers. There was concern that dredging of the river's bottom, which had been going on since the bridge was completed, may have cause the velocity of the river to speed up and helped undermine the bridge's foundation. But experts from the Interstate Commerce Commission ruled this out in November 1933.

Later history
The Pennsylvania Railroad rebuilt the bridge in 1934 and 1935. The United States Commission of Fine Arts, which had de facto approval authority over all structures built in the city, approved the plans for the new bridge in mid-December 1933. The Army Corps of Engineers gave their approval in mid-January 1934. By July 1934, the D.C. Commissioners and National Capital Planning Commission (which had approval over all major structures and all roads, bridges, and memorials in the metropolitan area) had given their approval as well, and construction went forward. Protective pilings and walls were also placed around the piers, to prevent fast-moving water from scouring around the piers and causing another collapse.

In 1942, a Pennsylvania Railroad bridge watchman was struck by a train and thrown from the bridge.  The bridge suffered a fire early in the morning on January 24, 1944. At first, the Federal Bureau of Investigation feared that the bridge had been set on fire deliberately as an act of sabotage. But the Metropolitan Police Department said that the fire started when a night watchman dumped hot coals from the stove in his watchhouse down the embankment of the river, igniting dry brush and oil (which had dripped from passing rail cars) at the base of the bridge. A fireboat and 20 fire trucks and engines were needed to put out the blaze, which sent flames  into the air. Some of the bridge's spans buckled because of the fire's heat.

Major repair work was done on the bridge in 1999. The work was done in conjunction with repairs and upgrades to the New York Avenue Bridge, a highway bridge just upstream. The work included assessing damage to and repairing the concrete piers under the bridge, replacing masonry and repairing the abutments, and repairing and maintaining the steel girders which form the bridge's superstructure.

It is unclear how safe the bridge actually is, or what its current lifespan is projected to be. According to the Federal Railroad Administration (FRA), the federal government does not maintain an inventory of rail bridges or their condition. Nor is the federal government responsible for railroad bridge safety: "Responsibility for railroad bridge safety rests with the owner of the track carried by the structure. The owner ensures the bridge is capable of safely accommodating all rail traffic operated over the track and specifies the maximum weight the structure can support." There is also no federal law or regulation which requires railroad bridge owners to ensure the safety of their bridges. Rather, it is FRA "policy" that they do so by following the recommendations contained in the American Railway Engineering and Maintenance-of-Way Association's Manual for Railway Engineering and by inspecting bridges annually using trained, experienced inspectors.

See also
Anacostia Railroad Bridge (CSX Transportation - Freight train bridge)

References

Amtrak bridges
Railway bridges in Washington, D.C.
Bridges over the Anacostia River
Pennsylvania Railroad bridges
Bridges completed in 1905
1933 in Washington, D.C.
Steel bridges in the United States
1905 establishments in Washington, D.C.